The King's School, Worcester is an English private day school refounded by Henry VIII in 1541. It occupies a site adjacent to  Worcester Cathedral on the banks of the River Severn in the centre of the city of Worcester. It offers mixed-sex mainstream education that follows the UK National Curriculum to around 1,465 pupils aged 2 to 18. At age 11, approximately two thirds of pupils join the senior school from its two prep schools, King's Hawford and King's St Albans, while others come from maintained schools in the city of Worcester and the surrounding areas that include Malvern, Redditch, Kidderminster, Evesham and Pershore.

Campuses
The King's, Worcester group consists of three different schools. These include:

King's Hawford: (ages 2–11, c.320 pupils), formerly an autonomous fee-paying prep school named Hawford Lodge, purchased by King's in 1992, situated north of central Worcester. No recommendations were made in the 2008 inspection.
King's St Alban's: (ages 2–11, c.215 pupils), formerly the Cathedral Choir School, amalgamated with King's in 1943, situated adjacent to the senior school. St Alban's includes a pre-prep department for ages 4–7, opened September 2009.
King's Worcester: (ages 11–18, c.930 pupils), the senior school.

The senior school is situated on Worcester's College Green, next to Worcester Cathedral and on the east bank of the River Severn. Many of the school's buildings on the Green are leased from the cathedral, including College Hall (formerly the monastic refectory, for many years the school's only teaching hall, and currently an assembly hall) and Edgar Tower, the medieval gatehouse to College Green, which for many years housed the school library. The school and the cathedral maintain a close relationship, with the school providing cathedral choristers and using the cathedral for major services. The most senior members of school staff, the cathedral choristers, and the school's King's and Queen's Scholars are ex officio members of the cathedral foundation, while the school is required by statute to have the cathedral Dean and Chapter represented on its governing body.

The school owns extensive land next to New Road cricket ground across the river, used as sports pitches and fields. The school also owns an outward bound centre, the Old Chapel near Crickhowell in Mid Wales.

History
Following the dissolution of the monastery in 1540, the new cathedral foundation included provision for a choir school for ten cathedral choristers and tuition for forty King's Scholars. The school was one of seven "King's Schools" established or re-endowed by Henry VIII following the dissolution. On 7 December 1541, Henry VIII appointed the school's first headmaster, John Pether, by means of a letter to Richard Rich. One early headmaster, Henry Bright is mentioned in Thomas Fuller’s Worthies of England, and is commemorated in Worcester Cathedral.

The school was managed by the cathedral Dean and Chapter until 1884, when Headmaster W.E. Bolland's New Scheme introduced governance by a separate Governing Body, on which the Chapter nonetheless retained a majority. From its inception until the construction of School House in 1888, all teaching was conducted in College Hall, the former monastic refectory.

From 1945 to 1976, the school participated in the direct grant scheme, accepting pupils funded by central government on a competitive basis. The school first admitted girls in small numbers to the sixth form in 1971, prior to the establishment of College House in 1977, which housed 21 girls. In 1989 the decision was made to make the school fully co-educational, with girls entering the Lower Fourth (Year 7) in 1991. Having accommodated boarders since its inception, the final boarders left in July 1999.

Activities
The school has an artist-in-residence and actor-in-residence, provides one-to-one LAMDA tuition and has several performance venues, including the Keyes Building, College Hall and the John Moore Theatre. Art exhibitions, plays, musicals, dance showcases and other performances are staged across the age range. Partly due to its links with the cathedral the school has a musical tradition.

The school has achieved success at rowing with the King's School Worcester Boat Club, and maintains a boathouse on the River Severn. The school also has an indoor swimming pool on the junior school campus and an outdoor pool at Hawford. Several sports undertake regular tours abroad.

The school has an active Combined Cadet Force with army and RAF sections.

The school produces three pupil-authored publications: Stepping Fourth (for the Fourth Forms, years 7–8), The Removes' Gazette (for the Removes, years 9–10) and Term Time a Sixth Form magazine, first published in summer 2010, as a replacement for the defunct King's Herald newspaper. The King's Herald was an annual newspaper written, compiled and formatted in a single day and submitted to a national competition which it won three times. The school also runs a creative writing club and annual competition, and regular Sixth-Form Soundbites evenings devoted to literature, music and wine. The debating club meets weekly, and pupils regularly participate in regional and national debating and public speaking contests.

Year classification system
The school uses its own class nomenclature. In the main section of the school (ages 11–18), the classification runs as follows:

Houses
Upon reaching the 'Lower Remove', pupils are assigned to one of the following houses (listed with their respective colours):

Castle, Choir, Hostel and School Houses, all former boarding houses, are named for the buildings which originally housed them. As boarding diminished during the 1990s, these houses either converted to day houses (School and Choir), or were discontinued (Castle and Hostel). The remaining houses, which originated as day-boys' houses, are named for former school headmasters (Saint Oswald and Saint Wulstan, both Bishops of Worcester, being regarded as "headmasters" of the former monastic school).

Old Vigornians

All former pupils are considered to be Old Vigornians, and can use the post-nominal letters OV. Predecessor institutions are not considered: only those who attended King's from its refoundation in 1541 onwards are listed below.

See also 
List of English and Welsh endowed schools (19th century)

References

Secondary sources

External links 

 The King's School, Worcester official website
 Independent Schools Council: The King's School, Worcester
 Guide to Independent Schools: The King's School, Worcester
 The Old Vigornians website

1541 establishments in England
Choir schools in England
Educational institutions established in the 1540s
Private schools in Worcestershire
Schools in Worcester, England
Member schools of the Headmasters' and Headmistresses' Conference
 
Schools with a royal charter